Pancake is an unincorporated community in Coryell County, in the U.S. state of Texas.

History
Pancake contained a post office from 1884 until 1908. The first postmaster, John R. Pancake, gave the community its name.

References

Unincorporated communities in Coryell County, Texas
Unincorporated communities in Texas